Surprise is an unincorporated community in Hamilton Township, Jackson County, Indiana.

History
According to tradition, the community was so named from the surprise expressed when the town succeeded in gaining a post office and railroad depot. The Surprise post office closed in 1905.

Geography

References

Unincorporated communities in Jackson County, Indiana
Unincorporated communities in Indiana